Guy R. Rankin, IV is the former Chief Executive Officer (CEO) of the Harris County Housing Authority in Houston, Texas.

He is the CEO and President of International Housing Solutions.

References

External links 
 International Housing Solutions

Hurricane Ike
Year of birth missing (living people)
Place of birth missing (living people)
Living people